Baltasár de León García was the founder of El Hatillo Town, Miranda, and was the most important contributor to its development in the 16th century.

Venezuelan founders
Year of birth missing
Year of death missing
Viceroyalty of New Granada people